The 2021 Stephen F. Austin Lumberjacks football team represented Stephen F. Austin State University in the 2021 NCAA Division I FCS football season as a member of the Western Athletic Conference (WAC). The Lumberjacks were led by third-year head coach Colby Carthel and played their home games at Homer Bryce Stadium.

The Western Athletic Conference and ASUN Conference announced the formation of the WAC-ASUN Challenge (AQ7) for the 2021 season on February 23, 2021.  The Challenge included the four fully qualified Division I (FCS) members of the WAC (Abilene Christian, Lamar, Sam Houston, and Stephen F. Austin) and Central Arkansas, Eastern Kentucky, and Jacksonville State of the ASUN Conference.  The winner of the challenge received an auto-bid to the NCAA Division I FCS football playoffs.

Previous season

The Lumberjacks finished the 2020–21 season with 6–4 overall record, for the program's first winning season since 2014. All four losses were against NCAA Division I FBS teams.

Preseason

Preseason polls

WAC Poll
The Western Athletic Conference coaches released their preseason poll on July 27, 2021. The Lumberjacks were picked to finish second in the conference.  In addition, several Lumberjacks were selected to both the preseason WAC Offense and Defense teams.

 Note: Dixie State is not included since they are not playing a full WAC schedule due to previous non-conference game contracts.  Dixie State players are eligible for individual rewards.

Preseason All–WAC Team

Offense

Xavier Gipson – Wide Receiver, SO
Zach Ingram – Offensive Lineman, SR

Defense

Brandon Thompson, Jr. – Defensive Lineman, JR
Brevin Randle – Linebacker, SO

AQ7 Poll
The AQ7 coaches also released their preseason poll on July 27, 2021. The Lumberjacks were picked to finish fourth in the ASUN-WAC Challenge.

Schedule

References

Stephen F. Austin
Stephen F. Austin Lumberjacks football seasons
2021 NCAA Division I FCS playoff participants
Stephen F. Austin Lumberjacks football